Sergei Aleksandrovich Danilov (born 1 July 1989) is a Russian professional football player.

Club career
He made his Russian Football National League debut for FC Ufa on 9 July 2012 in a game against PFC Spartak Nalchik.

External links
 
 
 

1989 births
Sportspeople from Samara, Russia
Living people
Russian footballers
Association football midfielders
FC Ufa players
FC Tyumen players
Russian expatriate footballers
Expatriate footballers in Georgia (country)
PFC Krylia Sovetov Samara players
FC Zenit-Izhevsk players
FC Volgar Astrakhan players
FC Tolyatti players
FC Mashuk-KMV Pyatigorsk players